O Jornal was a Brazilian newspaper published in Rio de Janeiro, Brazil. It was founded in 1919, and ceased publications in 1974.

References 

1919 establishments in Brazil
1975 disestablishments in Brazil
Newspapers established in 1919
Publications disestablished in 1975
Defunct newspapers published in Brazil
Portuguese-language newspapers
Diários Associados
Mass media in Rio de Janeiro (city)